Dylan Hoogerwerf (born 9 August 1995) is a Dutch short track speed skater.

He qualified for the men's 500 metres and men's 5000 m relay event at the 2018 Winter Olympics.

Biography
Hoogerwerf started doing short track speed skating when he was 9 years old, in The Hague.

Hoogerwerf studies Graphic Design at the Friesland College in Heerenveen.

References

1995 births
Living people
Dutch male short track speed skaters
Olympic short track speed skaters of the Netherlands
Short track speed skaters at the 2018 Winter Olympics
Short track speed skaters at the 2022 Winter Olympics
Sportspeople from Delft
Competitors at the 2015 Winter Universiade
21st-century Dutch people